327 Squadron may refer to:

 No. 327 Squadron RAF, a Royal Air Force unit in World War II
 327th Aero Squadron, an aero squadron in the  Air Service, United States Army
 327th Airlift Squadron, United States Air Force
 327th Bombardment Squadron, United States
 327th Fighter Squadron, United States Army Air Forces
 327th Fighter-Interceptor Squadron, United States Air Force
 327th Troop Carrier Squadron, United States Army Air Forces